The Diving competition at the 22nd SEA Games was held December 7–10, 2003 in My Dinh Aquatics Centre, Hanoi, Vietnam.

Medalists

Medal table

Men

Women

External links
 Results

2003 Southeast Asian Games events
2003
Diving
Southeast Asian Games